Extended Versions is the tenth release and second live album released by Stryper, although it was recorded during the time that 7 Weeks: Live in America, 2003 was recorded.

Track listing
 "Makes Me Wanna Sing" (Sweet)  4:36 
 "Calling on You" (Sweet)  3:45 
 "Free" (Sweet, Sweet)  3:39 
 "More Than a Man" (Sweet)  4:34 
 "You Won't Be Lonely" (Sweet, Gaines)  4:24 
 "Reach Out" (Sweet, Sweet)  5:26 
 "The Way" (Fox)  3:50 
 "Soldiers Under Command" (Sweet, Sweet)  5:22 
 "To Hell with the Devil" (Sweet, Sweet)  5:57 
 "Honestly" (Sweet)  4:25

References

Stryper albums
2006 live albums
Live heavy metal albums
Live glam metal albums